The Laos national under-20 football team is the major U-20 youth team of Laos.

Players

Current squad 
 The following 23 players were selected for the 2023 AFC U-20 Asian Cup qualification phase.

Coaching staff

Results and fixtures

2022

See also 
 Laos national football team
 Laos women's national football team
 Laos national under-23 football team
 Laos national under-21 football team
 Laos national under-17 football team

References 

Asian national under-20 association football teams
U20